Henry Poingdestre (1832?–1885) was a New Zealand runholder, rabbit farmer and eccentric. He was born in St Helier, Channel Islands in about 1832.

References

1832 births
1885 deaths
People from Saint Helier
New Zealand farmers